Bernard Yago (July 1916 – 5 October 1997) was an Ivoirian Cardinal of the Catholic Church. He served as Archbishop of Abidjan from 1960 to 1994 and was made cardinal in 1983.

Biography
Bernard Yago was born in Pass, Yopougon, and studied at the seminary in Abidjan before being ordained to the priesthood on 1 May 1947, the second African priest to do so after Rene Kouassi. He then served as a professor at the Minor Seminary of Bingerville and as director of the Pre-Seminary École de Petit Clerics until 1956, whence he began pastoral work in Abidjan until 1957. Yago furthered his studies at the Catholic Institute of Paris from 1957 to 1959. Upon his return to Côte d'Ivoire, he was Counselor of Catholic Action in Abidjan from until 1960.

On 5 April 1960, Yago was appointed Archbishop of Abidjan by Pope John XXIII. He received his episcopal consecration on the following 8 May from Pope John himself, with Bishops Napoléon-Alexandre Labrie, CIM and Fulton John Sheen serving as co-consecrators, in St. Peter's Basilica. Yago attended the Second Vatican Council from 1962 to 1965, and sat on the Council's Central Preparatory Commission.

Pope John Paul II made him Cardinal-Priest of San Crisogono in the consistory of 2 February 1983. Yago, who was the first cardinal from Côte d'Ivoire, resigned his post as Archbishop on 19 December 1994, after 34 years. He lost the right to participate in a papal conclave upon reaching the age of eighty in July 1996.

Cardinal Yago died in Abidjan at age 81. He is buried in the metropolitan cathedral of Abidjan.

Legacy 
Yago was one of the only clergy in Côte d'Ivoire who openly opposed the construction of the gargantuan basilica, modeled on St. Peter's Basilica in Vatican City, built by the former president Félix Houphouët-Boigny in his home village of Yamoussoukro because of the enormous waste of hundreds of millions of dollars, and attempted to persuade Pope John Paul II from consecrating it during his visit to the country.

References

External links
Catholic-Hierarchy 
Cardinals of the Holy Roman Church

1916 births
1997 deaths
Ivorian cardinals
20th-century Roman Catholic archbishops in Africa
Participants in the Second Vatican Council
Cardinals created by Pope John Paul II
Ivorian Roman Catholic archbishops
Institut Catholique de Paris alumni
People from Abidjan
20th-century cardinals
Roman Catholic archbishops of Abidjan